The 1948–49 Syracuse Nationals season was the third season of the franchise in the National Basketball League. The Nationals finished with the first winning season in team history.

Roster

Regular season

Eastern Division standings

Playoffs
Won Opening Round (Hammond Calumet Buccaneers) 2–0Lost Division Semifinals (Anderson Packers) 3–1

Awards and records
Al Cervi – COY, All-NBL First Team
Dolph Schayes – ROY

References

Philadelphia 76ers seasons
Syracuse